Gheorghe Berceanu (28 December 1949 – 30 August 2022) was a Romanian light-flyweight Greco-Roman wrestler. He won the world title in 1969 and 1972, the European title in 1970, 1972, and 1973, and an Olympic gold medal in 1972 in Munich and a silver in 1976 in Montreal. Berceanu spent most of his career at Steaua București, and later worked there as a coach.

Berceanu died on 30 August 2022, at the age of 72.

References

External links

1949 births
2022 deaths
Olympic wrestlers of Romania
Wrestlers at the 1972 Summer Olympics
Wrestlers at the 1976 Summer Olympics
Romanian male sport wrestlers
Olympic gold medalists for Romania
Olympic silver medalists for Romania
Olympic medalists in wrestling
World Wrestling Championships medalists
Medalists at the 1976 Summer Olympics
Medalists at the 1972 Summer Olympics
European Wrestling Championships medalists
People from Dolj County